Miilee is an Indian Hindi television series broadcast on STAR Plus. The series is an Indian version of the popular Argentine telenovela Muñeca brava(also known as Wild Angel).

The series is set in the backdrop of Shimla.

Overview 
Miilee is the story of a young orphan girl, living in a convent in Shimla, who is brought to live in the Rastogi mansion as a househelp. Miilee is a very simple and carefree girl, adorable to all. She is a complete tomboy, an incorrigible prankster, and at the same time, a naive, sensitive and caring girl. She later discovers that the head of the Rastogi family is her biological father.

Cast 
 Mona Vasu as Miilee
 Ajay Gehi as Rahul Rastogi
 Kiran Kumar as Vishal Rastogi
 Aasif Sheikh as Sagar Malhotra
 Mahru Sheikh as Kamini Vishal Rastogi
 Mohit Malik as Aaoni: Miilee's love interest
 Imran Mashkoor Khan as Karan Malhotra
 Shonali Malhotra
 Addite Shirwaikar as Khushi
 Kiran Dubey 
 Kanika Kohli  as Ramona Rastogi
Sushma Seth as Mrs. Rastogi
 Shagufta Ali as Madhubala
 Shabnam Sayed as Rastogi Family's Maid
 Rajeev Verma as Father Manuel
 Vineet Kumar as Heeralal

Reception
The series opened with a rating of 10.67 TVR with an overall rating of 9.2 TVR in that week.

References 

StarPlus original programming
Indian television series
2005 Indian television series debuts
2006 Indian television series endings
Indian television series based on non-Indian television series